Lee Austin Bates (born July 2, 1991), better known by his alias Must Die (stylized as MUST DIE!), is an American electronic musician, DJ, and producer. Born in Houston, Bates is associated primarily for his music in the dubstep genre. Bates is known for the track "VIPs", a collaboration with American musician Skrillex, released on the label Owsla. Bates has collaborated with artists such as Skream, Eptic, Zomboy, and Boyinaband, and has produced remixes for Svdden Death, Seven Lions, Excision, and Slander, among others.

Career 
Bate's stage name is inspired by the title of the film John Tucker Must Die, stating that "I thought that naming myself after something terrible would be a good laugh".

Bates began releasing music under his current alias in 2012. That year, he released a remix of "The Drop" by Bro Safari. In 2013, he released a remix of Candyland's "Get Wild".  Bates also produced several tracks on Dim Mak Records, including the extended play "Water Temple". He made his first release on the label Never Say Day Records with the extended play "Fever Dream", proceeding to release tracks less frequently. Bates first collaborated with American dubstep producer Zomboy on the track "Survivors", as part of Zomboy's LP "The Outbreak".

In September 2014, Bates released his first album, "Death & Magic", on Skrillex's label Owsla. The opening track, "Gem Shards", is described by Mixmag as containing "giant builds, mammoth drops and piercing noises so sharp that they'll draw blood". Bates described the album as "equal parts moody and bright", saying he "wanted to weave between two vast extremes of musicality in order to show a full spectrum of diversity". A remix compilation for "Death & Magic" was released in 2015, including remixes from Ape Drums and Snails. Bates collaborated with English musician Boyinaband as part of a challenge to create an album within a day, resulting in the album "Common Drop". Bates also collaborated with Skrillex on the track "VIPs", and proceeded to produce a remix of the track in 2018.

Bates continued to release music through Never Say Die Records throughout later years. Bates released the 4-track EP "Forever Digital" in September 2017, featuring a more futuristic style of dubstep, and described as "filled with thunderous percussion and explosive synths". He also appeared in the label compilation "Hype Future II". This was followed by a remix of Slander and Saymyname's "I Can't Escape", released through Insomniac.

In February 2019, Bates released "Bliss 2K" on Never Say Die, a dubstep track with hardstyle influences. This was continued with "Chaos", released on May of the same year, and "Epiphany System" in June. In August 2019, Bates produced a remix of Svdden Death's "Castles". Bates made several more notable releases throughout 2019, including "Misery System", and "Funeral Zone". Bates collaborated with Zomboy a second time on the track "Revival" for the EP "Rock and Roll Pt. 2".

In August 2020, Bates released a remix of the song "Another Me" by Seven Lions, Excision, and Wooli. Bates announced his second album, titled "Crisis Vision" in April 2021, which was released on Never Say Die Records the following month. This was preceded with several singles from the album on the label, including "Nerve Damage", "Hellburst", and "Sorrow Tech". The announcement was followed by the single "LOL OK", a collaboration with dubstep producer Skream and Akeos.

In 2022, Bates collaborated with Zomboy on a track on Zomboy's EP Dead Man Walking Pt. 1. He released the single "ANGELWARE" later in March.

Discography

Albums

Extended plays

References

External links 
 

Living people
American electronic musicians
American record producers
Dubstep musicians
1991 births